The Moche Rip Curl Pro Portugal 2014 is an event of the Association of Surfing Professionals for 2014 ASP World Tour.

This event was held from 12 to 23 October and contested by 36 surfers.

Round 1

Round 2

Round 3

Round 4

Round 5

Quarter-finals

Semi-finals

Final

References
 Site ASP

Rip Curl Pro Portugal
2014 in surfing
2014 in Portuguese sport
October 2014 sports events in Europe
Sport in Leiria District